Sanilac can refer to:

 Sanilac County, Michigan
 Sanilac Township, Michigan
 Port Sanilac, Michigan
 Port Sanilac Lighthouse
 Port Sanilac Masonic and Town Hall
 Sanilac/GB Broadcasting
 Sanilac Petroglyphs Historic State Park
 Sanilac Shores Underwater Preserve

See also
 Sanilhac (disambiguation)